Cerodrillia bahamensis is a species of sea snail, a marine gastropod mollusk in the family Drilliidae.

Description
The white shell attains a length of 10 mm. The protoconch consists of 2.1 whorls.

Distribution
This marine species occurs off the Bahamas.

References

 Bartsch, P. "A review of some west Atlantic turritid mollusks." Memorias de la Sociedad Cubana de Historia Natural 17.2 (1943): 81–122.

External links

bahamensis
Gastropods described in 1943